Ronald Philip Bird (27 December 1941 – 20 March 2005) was an English professional footballer who scored 66 goals from 269 appearances in the Football League in the 1960s and early 1970s. He played more than 100 league matches for each of Bradford Park Avenue and Cardiff City, and also had spells with Bury and Crewe Alexandra.

Career
Born in Erdington, Birmingham, Bird played football at youth level for England alongside Bobby Moore. He began his club career as an apprentice at his hometown club Birmingham City, turning professional in January 1959 at the age of 18, but found first team chances hard to come by and left to join Bradford Park Avenue, being signed by manager Jimmy Scoular in June 1961. He quickly established himself in the side and helped the club to retain their Division Three status after being promoted the previous year. He became a prolific penalty scorer at the club and his 14 penalties scored in league football remains a club record.

He eventually left Bradford in 1965 to join Bury but only spent seven months at Gigg Lane before being signed again by Jimmy Scoular, this time at his new club Cardiff City for £5,000. He helped the club to win the Welsh Cup in his first season, one of three times he won the competition at Cardiff, and gained a reputation for scoring spectacular goals. He left Cardiff after five seasons at the club, after falling out with management over not being selected for the Cup Winners' Cup quarter-final match against Real Madrid, and joined Crewe Alexandra where he spent one year before dropping into non-league football with Gloucester City. He scored 21 times from 89 matches in all competitions during two seasons with the Tigers, and was appointed club captain for the 1973–74 season.

Later life

After retiring from football he took over as manager at Ebbw Vale and Bridgend Town before later returning to work with Jimmy Scoular as his assistant manager at Newport County. He left his post at the club during the 1978–79 season and later took over as landlord of the Golden Cross and Romilly Arms pubs in Cardiff. His experience in the trade prompted Cardiff City to hire him to take charge of the several bars in the club's ground and he later took up a number of positions at the club including match day hospitality manager, manager of the players' restaurant and a commentator for the club's website. He was taken ill in 2003, originally thinking he was suffering from flu, and was diagnosed with leukaemia. He subsequently stepped down from his various roles at the club, although after recovering somewhat he later returned to commentate on matches again before he died in the University Hospital of Wales, Cardiff, in 2005.

Honours
Cardiff City
 Welsh Cup winner: 1966–67, 1969–70, 1970–71

References

1941 births
2005 deaths
People from Erdington
Footballers from Birmingham, West Midlands
English footballers
Association football wingers
Birmingham City F.C. players
Bradford (Park Avenue) A.F.C. players
Bury F.C. players
Cardiff City F.C. players
Crewe Alexandra F.C. players
Gloucester City A.F.C. players
Bridgend Town A.F.C. players
English Football League players
English football managers
Ebbw Vale F.C. managers
Cardiff City F.C. non-playing staff